Samuel Thompson (born 8 January 1993) is an Australian professional tennis player.

Thompson, teamed with Masa Jovanovic, won a wildcard playoff to earn entry into the mixed doubles of the 2015 Australian Open.  Prior to this, his best result was qualifying for an ITF Men's Circuit tournament in 2012.

Thompson competes for the Tasmania Devils of the Asia-Pacific Tennis League.

Thompson also won the 2015 Bendigo Championships in singles.

References

External links
 
 

1993 births
Living people
Australian male tennis players
Tennis players from Melbourne
21st-century Australian people